Gerhard Tittel (born 13 May 1937) is a German composer and conductor.

Life 
Born in Vielau), Tittel first worked as a drafter in Zwickau. From 1958 to 1964, he studied violin with Otto Klinge and composition with Günter Kochan at the Hochschule für Musik "Hanns Eisler". In 1966 he became a lecturer and in 1981 a professor for composition and music setting. From 1977 to 1992 he co-founded and directed the Berlin Youth Symphony Orchestra.

Work 
 Klaviersuite (1966)
 Musik für Streichorchester (1967)
 Dialoge für Klavier zu 4 Händen (1968)
 Konzert für Klavier und Orchester (1971)

Further reading 
 Peter Hollfelder: Geschichte der Klaviermusik. Volume 1, Florian Noetzel Verlag, Wilhelmshaven 1989, .
 Axel Schniederjürgen (ed.): Kürschners Musiker-Handbuch. 5th edition, K. G. Saur Verlag, Munich 2006, .

References

External links 
 Werke von Gerhard Tittel by 
 
 

1937 births
Living people
Musicians from Saxony
20th-century classical composers
German composers
German conductors (music)
Academic staff of the Hochschule für Musik Hanns Eisler Berlin